The women's team competition at the 2009 European Team Judo Championships was held on 3 October at the Miskolc Sports Hall in Miskolc, Hungary.

Results

References

External links
 

Wteam
European Women's Team Judo Championships
EU 2009
Euro